Blepharoplasty (Greek: blepharon, "eyelid" + plassein "to form") is the plastic surgery operation for correcting defects, deformities, and disfigurations of the eyelids; and for aesthetically modifying the eye region of the face. With the excision and the removal, or the repositioning (or both) of excess tissues, such as skin and adipocyte fat, and the reinforcement of the corresponding muscle and tendon tissues, the blepharoplasty procedure resolves functional and cosmetic problems of the periorbita, which is the area from the eyebrow to the upper portion of the cheek. The procedure is more common among women, who accounted for approximately 85% of blepharoplasty procedures in 2014 in the US and 88% of such procedures in the UK.

The operative goals of a blepharoplastic procedure are the restoration of the correct functioning to the affected eyelid(s) and the restoration of the aesthetics of the eye-region of the face, which are achieved by eliminating excess skin from the eyelid(s), smoothing the underlying eye muscles, tightening the supporting structures, and resecting and re-draping the excess fat of the retroseptal area of the eye, in order to produce a smooth anatomic transition from the lower eyelid to the cheek.

In an eye surgery procedure, the usual correction or modification (or both) is of the upper and the lower eyelids, and of the surrounding tissues of the eyebrows, the upper nasal-bridge area, and the upper portions of the cheeks, which are achieved by modifying the periosteal coverings of the facial bones that form the orbit (eye socket). The periosteum comprises two-layer connective tissues that cover the bones of the human body:
 the external layer of networks of dense, connective tissues with blood vessels, and
 the internal, deep layer of collagenous bundles composed of spindle-shaped cells of connective tissue, and a network of thin, elastic fibres.

The East Asian blepharoplasty procedure differs from the classic blepharoplasty. In younger patients, the goal of the surgery is to create a supratarsal fold ("double eyelid surgery") whereas in older patients the goals are to create or elevate the supratarsal fold and to resect surplus eyelid skin ("Asian bleparoplasty").

Medical uses
The thorough pre-operative medical and surgical histories, and the physical examination of the patient's periorbital area (eyebrow-to-cheek-to-nose), determine if the patient can safely undergo a blepharoplasty procedure to feasibly resolve (correct or modify, or both) the functional and aesthetic indications presented by the patient. Sequentially, lower eyelid blepharoplasty can successfully address the anatomic matters of excess eyelid skin, slackness of the eye-muscles and of the orbital septum (palpebral ligament), excess orbital fat, malposition of the lower eyelid, and prominence of the nasojugal groove, where the orbit (eye socket) meets the slope of the nose.

Concerning the upper eyelid, a blepharoplasty procedure can resolve the loss of peripheral vision, caused by the slackness of the upper-eyelid skin draping over the eyelashes; the outer and the upper portions of the field of vision of the patient are affected and cause him or her difficulty in performing mundane activities such as driving an automobile and reading a book.

Cosmetic uses

In many Asian countries, double eyelid surgery is the most popular surgery, especially in Korea. Depending on the methods, directing doctors' experience, and the difficulty of the individual case, this surgery can cost between about $2000 and $4000 US dollars. The procedure is famous for producing double-eyelid for patients in the most natural way for the long-term. This kind of operation normally takes about 30 minutes to an hour and patients are not required to stay hospitalized afterward. The stitches removal day is about 5 to 7 days after the surgery. Because of how common and simple the operation is, numerous foreigners go to South Korea each year for blepharoplasty.

Procedures

A blepharoplasty procedure usually is performed through external surgical incisions made along the natural skin lines (creases) of the upper and the lower eyelids, which then hide the surgical scars from view, especially when affected by the skin creases below the eyelashes of the lower eyelid. The incisions can also be made from the conjunctiva, the interior surface of the lower eyelid, as in the case of a transconjunctival blepharoplasty.

Transconjunctival lower blepharoplasty technique was pioneered by Clinical Professor of Surgery at the University of Chicago Medicine, Dr. Anthony J. Geroulis and introduced to medical trial in 1998. Transconjunctival Technique has become the norm in the plastic surgery field with most surgeons preferring it over the external surgical incisions. This technique is particularly useful for patients with darker skin tones where standard external incision often leaves a visible white scar.

Transconjunctival blepharoplasty technique permits the excision (cutting and removal) of the lower-eyelid adipose tissue without leaving a visible scar, but, the transconjunctival blepharoplasty technique does not allow the removal of excess eyelid-skin.

A blepharoplasty operation usually requires 1–3 hours to complete. Post-operatively, swelling and bruising is expected and will usually resolve without further intervention, although application of cold compresses can help to reduce the duration and discomfort. There are no standardized outcome measures for upper or lower blepharoplasty. Blepharoplasty is generally a relatively safe surgery, but possible complications include hematoma/ecchymosis, lagophthalmos (incomplete or abnormal closure of the eyelids), ptosis (drooping of the upper eyelid), scarring, dry eyes, orbital hematoma/compartment syndrome, lymphedema, and ocular motility disorders.

After the procedure, a type of stitch known as a canthopexy is placed near the outer corner of the lower eyelid, which is inside the tissue. This allows the eyelid's position to remain fixed during the healing process. The canthopexy is dissolved after four to six weeks of use. For particular patients, a mid-face elevation may be required to rejuvenate the lower eyelid-cheek complex.

The anatomic condition of the eyelids, the "wear-and-tear" quality of the patient's skin, his or her age, and the general condition of the adjacent tissues, consequent to the anatomic conditions of the patient, affect the functional and aesthetic results achieved with the eyelid surgery. Additional to the anatomic conditions of the eye region of the patient, the occurrence, or not, of medical complications is determined by factors such as:
 Dry-eye syndrome – which can become exacerbated by the disruption of the natural, lacrimal (tear) film of the eyes
 Palpebral skin laxity – looseness of the lower eyelid margin, which predisposes the lower eyelid to malposition
 Eyeball prominence – the protrusion of the eyeball in relation to the malar (cheek) complex, which predisposes the lower eyelid to malposition

History
As techniques began developing the ancient Greeks and Romans began writing down and collecting everything they knew involving these procedures. Aulus Cornelius Celsus, a first-century Roman, described making an excision in the skin to relax the eyelids in his book De Medicina.

Karl Ferdinand von Gräfe coined the phrase blepharoplasty in 1818 when the technique was used for repairing deformities caused by cancer in the eyelids.

Laser
Laser blepharoplasty is the performance of eyelid surgery using a laser instead of a scalpel. Laser blepharoplasty is often combined with laser eyelid rejuvenation, as the two procedures can be performed in conjunction.

A CO2 laser blepharoplasty offers many benefits over a blepharoplasty performed using a scalpel. Some of these benefits include less bleeding, shortened surgical time, better intraoperative visibility, less bruising and swelling, less pain or discomfort, and smoother healing.

Historically there has been some contention as to the categorization of laser treatment on upper or lower eyelids as blepharoplasty, which is itself by definition surgical. The statutory definition of surgery and that supported by the American College of Surgeons states that surgery is the "treatment ... by any instrument causing localized alteration or transportation of live human tissue, which include lasers...".

See also 

 Eye surgery
 Oculoplastics
 Plastic surgery
 Maxillofacial surgery

References 

Dermatologic procedures
Eye surgery
Oculoplastic surgery